Julijana Radivojević née Vijatović (Serbian Cyrillic: Јулијана Радивојевић; January 6, 1798 – 1837) is considered the first Serbian woman journalist. She also wrote poetry.

Biography
Julijana Vijatović was born in 1798, in Vršac, then part of Habsburg monarchy, where her father was a Serbian officer of the Imperial Austrian Army serving in the Military Frontier, the buffer between the Austrian Empire and the Ottoman Empire. After her parents died, Radivojević went to live with her uncle Aleksandar Nako (her mother's brother) in Vienna where she graduated from college. During the eight years in Vienna, she "almost forgot her mother's tongue", she wrote. In 1821, she moved to Pest and there she met and married Maks Radivojević, a tailor, and became acquainted with Serbian literature and national history.

Career 
Radivojević is best known for editing the small almanac Talia, published in Pest in 1829. She was the first woman to work on a literary almanac in the Serbian language. She also published the article "Good advice for Serbian daughters", based on Ebersberg's work "Friendly council for more mature female youth". There are also some manuscripts left with her poems; 14 sheets of paper. In 1832, Radivojević met the Czech writer Jan Kolar, who recorded her biographical data.

The Radivojevićs appeared in Pest in 1828 as subscribers to Avram Brankovic's book on the cosmos. In the list of renumbered Serbian books in 1829, it can be seen that she ordered them in Pančevo, as Mrs. "Julia Radivojević, a Serbian writer". As a buyer of Serbian books, Branković met that "Serbian writer" in 1840 in Pest.

Very little is known about her life and works of literature. According to Milorad Pavić, she died after 1837.

Monographs
 Cveta ili dobarь sovѣt serbskimь ktьrma 1300–2000
 Talia za godinu 1829 od Iuliane Radivoevičь rožd. Viatovičь u Pešti. Vъ Budimѣ pis. kr. vseuč. (1829), 16°, 58 str. 1829

Notes

 References 

Sources
 Magdalena Koh, Kad sazremo kao kultura... (When We Mature as a Culture...), Belgrade: Službeni glasnik, 2012.

Further reading
 Naša žena u književnom stvaranju (1941)
 ...kada sazremo kao kultura... Stvaralaštvo srpskih spisateljica na početku XX veka (kanon – žanr – rod) (2012)
 Francuska veza (2019)

1798 births
18th-century Serbian writers
18th-century Serbian women
Serbian journalists
Serbian women journalists
People from Vršac
1837 deaths